Steve Phillips is a New York Times bestselling author and political expert. He is the host of "Democracy in Color with Steve Phillips," a color-conscious political podcast, and founder of Democracy in Color, a multimedia platform on race and politics. Phillips is also a regular columnist for The Nation and The Guardian, and has published opinion pieces in The New York Times. He has appeared on multiple national radio and television networks including CNN, MSNBC, NBC, and C-SPAN. Phillips currently splits his time between San Francisco and Washington, D.C.

Early life and education
Phillips was born and raised in Cleveland Heights, Ohio. He is a graduate of Stanford University and University of California College of the Law, San Francisco.

Career

Public office
In 1992 he became the youngest person ever elected to public office in San Francisco when he won a seat on the San Francisco Board of Education. He went on to serve as president of the Board of Education.

Democracy in Color
Democracy in Color is a political media organization focused on political strategy and analysis at the intersection of race and politics.

Phillips founded Democracy in Color in 2016. He is the host of "Democracy in Color with Steve Phillips" podcast.

In 2016, Democracy in Color organized the first-ever panel on women of color in politics at the Democratic National Convention. In January 2017, Democracy in Color hosted the only DNC chair candidates forum focused on race and diversity.

Other
In 2014, Phillips co-authored the first-ever audit of Democratic Party spending and was named one of “America’s Top 50 Influencers” by Campaigns and Elections magazine.

Books

Brown Is The New White
His book Brown Is the New White made the New York Times bestseller list in March 2016 and Washington Post  bestseller list in February 2016.

How We Win the Civil War
His book How We Win the Civil War: Securing a Multiracial Democracy and Ending White Supremacy for Good was published in October 2022 from New Press.

Personal life
In 2008, Phillips began competing in marathons in San Francisco and has completed 20 marathons. He lives in San Francisco with his wife, the heiress Susan Sandler.

References

Living people
Stanford University alumni
University of California, Hastings College of the Law alumni
Year of birth missing (living people)
American political writers
American male non-fiction writers
21st-century American male writers
21st-century American non-fiction writers
Writers from San Francisco